Szabły Młode  is a village in the administrative district of Gmina Śniadowo, within Łomża County, Podlaskie Voivodeship, in north-eastern Poland.

The village has an approximate population of 150.

See also
Jakać

References

Villages in Łomża County